The St. Paul Saints, also known as the Fighting Saints were a minor league professional ice hockey team that played in the International Hockey League from 1959 to 1963. The Saints were based in St. Paul, Minnesota and played at the St. Paul Auditorium. The Saints won consecutive Turner Cups in 1960 and 1961 as league champions, and finished runners-up in 1962. Their geographically closest rival were the Minneapolis Millers, across the river.

Season-by-season results

External links
 standings and results

International Hockey League (1945–2001) teams
Sports in Saint Paul, Minnesota
Defunct ice hockey teams in Minnesota
Ice hockey clubs established in 1959
Sports clubs disestablished in 1963
1959 establishments in Minnesota
1963 disestablishments in Minnesota